Jorge Blanco may refer to:
 Jorge Blanco (artist) (born 1945), Venezuelan artist
  (active from 2009), film actor, writer and director
 Jorge Blanco (musician) (born 1991), Mexican actor and musician
 Salvador Jorge Blanco (1926–2010), 48th President of the Dominican Republic